The Ponte de São João  or St John's Bridge, designed by engineer Edgar Cardoso is a railway bridge in Portugal.  It replaced the functionality of the still standing Gustav Eiffel wrought iron Maria Pia Bridge in 1991.

References

Bridges in Porto
Bridges completed in 1991
Railway bridges in Portugal
1991 establishments in Portugal
Bridges over the Douro River